Pristimantis cacao is a species of frog in the family Strabomantidae.
It is endemic to Colombia.
Its natural habitat is tropical moist montane forests.
It is threatened by habitat loss.

References

cacao
Amphibians of Colombia
Endemic fauna of Colombia
Amphibians described in 1992
Taxonomy articles created by Polbot